Alison Lang may refer to:

 Alison Hughes (born 1971/72), née Lang, British tennis umpire
 Alison Lang (basketball), Canadian basketball player
 Alison Lang (writer), Gaelic writer